Urkhnishcha (Dargwa: Урхьниша) is a rural locality (a selo) in Urarinsky Selsoviet, Dakhadayevsky District, Republic of Dagestan, Russia. The population was 290 as of 2010. There are 2 streets.

Geography 
Urkhnishcha is located 32 km southwest of Urkarakh (the district's administrative centre) by road. Urkutamakhi 1-ya and Kurkimakhi are the nearest rural localities.

Nationalities 
Dargins live there.

References 

Rural localities in Dakhadayevsky District